Rolph Gobits (born September 19, 1947) is a Dutch-born, London-based photographer best known for his portrait, lifestyle, and landscape images.

Born in The Hague, he grew up in Amsterdam. In 1967 he went to England to study photography at the Royal College of Art in London and went on to shoot for magazines as well as for campaigns for the department store BIBA, Benson & Hedges, and the Daily Mail. In the decades since, Gobits has been commissioned by clients all over the world, including Mercedes-Benz, American Express, IBM, the Ritz-Carlton, Hewlett-Packard, Gucci, and Sotheby's, and he has been featured in the advertising journal Lürzer's Archive.

Gobits has exhibited his work widely, and his photographs are in private collections. In the winter of 2009, his work was included in a show at the Arts Institute at Bournemouth.

He is also a co-founder, with Bob Miller and Max Forsythe, of Lensmodern, a U.K.-based boutique stock photography site. Gobits is represented by Stockland Martel.

Awards 
 D&AD design awards Consumer Magazines: Features & Fiction.

References

External links 
 Rolph Gobits Photography
 Rolph Gobits portfolio at Stockland Martel
 Biography at debretts.com

1947 births
Living people
Landscape photographers
Portrait photographers
Dutch photographers
Artists from The Hague